Sherman is a ghost town in Albany County, Wyoming, United States.

Before being named Sherman, Union Pacific construction crews had called the area Lone Tree Pass and Evans Pass. The original name honored James A. Evans, who surveyed the area searching for a shorter route through Wyoming than the earlier trails which crossed at South Pass. Because the tracks were later moved a few miles south, the original town of Sherman no longer exists, but this is still the location of the Ames Monument, erected by the railroad to mark its original high point.

Ghost town

The small town of Sherman arose at the site north of the tracks where trains stopped to change engines on their transcontinental journey. The stop provided a roundhouse with five stalls and a turntable, two section houses, and a windmill with water tank. The trusses for the original wooden trestle bridge located west of Sherman were prefabricated in Chicago and shipped to the site. The bridge was the highest railroad bridge in the world at the time of its completion in 1868.

Several hundred people lived in Sherman, hunkered down upon a rocky, barren landscape interrupted only by a general store, post office, schoolhouse, two hotels (Sherman House and Summit House), and two saloons.

In 1885, William Murphy purchased the land that contained the monument, intending to cover the pyramid with advertising. The Union Pacific Railroad Company had other plans. The company obtained a special deed to the property in 1889. The railroad company twice moved its tracks southward toward more gradual grades over the Laramie Mountains, eroding Sherman's tenuous existence a few hundred yards west of the monument. The town's death knell came in 1918, when the railroad company closed its station house and moved the tracks about three miles (5 km) south. Residents soon abandoned Sherman, leaving behind a small cemetery that is still present today.

Nearby summits

Interstate 80
While not a particularly rugged mountain crossing, it is the highest point of the transcontinental Interstate 80.

Lincoln Highway
This location, where the pavement is still in place, is known simply as The Summit. A huge bronze bust of Abraham Lincoln once stood here; it has been moved to Sherman Summit.

Overland Route
There is no town there, but the official railroad name for this location is Sherman.

See also 
Buford, Wyoming: town near Sherman Summit that claims to be the highest town on Interstate 80.

References 

Landforms of Albany County, Wyoming
Mountain passes of Wyoming
Rail mountain passes of the United States
Ghost towns in Wyoming
Unincorporated communities in Albany County, Wyoming
Unincorporated communities in Wyoming